Plekocheilus distortus is a species of air-breathing land snail, a terrestrial pulmonate gastropod mollusk in the family Amphibulimidae.

Distribution 
This species occurs in:
 Brazil
 El Hatillo Municipality, Miranda, Venezuela

References

External links 

 http://data.gbif.org/species/16158557
 Photo of the shell

Amphibulimidae
Gastropods described in 1789